The 2021 TCR South America Touring Car Championship was the first season of TCR South America Touring Car Championship.

Calendar 
The championship is to begin in May 2021, with a maximum of 40 entries, eight rounds consisting of sixteen 35-minute races would be run in Argentina, Brazil and Uruguay.

Teams and drivers

It was announced on 1 August 2020, that 35 entry applications had been made for the 2021 season, and that the entry list would be published in late August. The entry applications included drivers from countries such as Argentina, Chile, Uruguay, Brazil, Paraguay, Peru and Mexico with six car marques on the entry applications.

Results and standings

Season summary

Scoring system

Drivers' championship

† – Drivers did not finish the race, but were classified as they completed over 75% of the race distance.

Teams' championship

† – Drivers did not finish the race, but were classified as they completed over 75% of the race distance.

Trophy' championship

Notes

References

External links
 

South America
TCR South America
TCR South America